Television in Belarus was introduced in 1956, when Belarus was still known as the Byelorussian SSR.
This is a list of television stations broadcasting in Belarus.

Television channels

See also
Eastern Bloc information dissemination

Television
Eastern Bloc mass media
 
Belarus